Benjamin Lynch (2 April 1913 – 6 August 1946) was a Scottish professional boxer who fought in the flyweight division. He is considered by some to be one of the finest boxers below the lightweight division in his era and has been described as the greatest fighter Scotland ever produced. The Ring Magazine founder Nat Fleischer rated Lynch as the No. 5 flyweight of all-time while his publication placed him 63rd in its 2002 list of the "Best Fighters of the Last 80 Years". Like Fleischer, both Statistical boxing website BoxRec and the International Boxing Research Organization also rank Lynch as the 5th greatest flyweight ever. He was elected to the Ring Magazine hall of fame in 1986 and the International Boxing Hall of Fame in 1998.

Life and career 

He was born in a tenement flat at 17 Florence Street, in the Gorbals area of Glasgow, and learned his fighting skills in the carnival booths that were popular in the West of Scotland during the Great Depression.

Early professional fights
Lynch made his professional debut in April 1931 with a second round stoppage of Young Bryce. His professional career started inauspiciously, winning only 8 of his first 15 fights. His first significant victory came in June 1932, when he beat the experienced Jock Joe Aitken on points.

In March 1933 he began an unbeaten run that would last three years. He beat Bert Kirby on points in October 1933, and in January 1934 beat Jim Brady in an eliminator for the Scottish Area flyweight title, beating Jim Campbell in May to take the title. He successfully defended the title against Campbell a month later. Lynch rounded off the year with further wins over opponents including Maurice Huguenin, Jim Brady, Valentin Angelmann, and Pedro Ruiz.

British and European flyweight champion 
Lynch won the British, European and world flyweight titles from Jackie Brown in an historic bout held in Manchester on 9 September 1935, the two having fought a draw six months earlier. The fight attracted enormous support from Glaswegians who travelled en masse to watch Lynch floor his opponent eight times before the bout was stopped in the second round.

In his next three fights he beat Gaston Maton (but had to pay a forfeit after failing to make the weight), Harry Orton, and Phil Milligan, before suffering his first defeat in three years when he lost on points to Jimmy Warnock in Belfast in March 1936.

In September 1936 he successfully defended his British and European titles against Pat Palmer, stopping the Londoner in the eighth round.

In November 1936, Lynch was sued for £2,000 by his former manager Samuel Wilson, for alleged breach of contract; Lynch counter-sued, alleging that Wilson had not carried out his duties properly.

World flyweight champion 
There was dispute, on at least on one side of the Atlantic, as to who was the genuine world flyweight champion. Lynch, recognised as champion in Britain, settled the matter when he out-pointed NBA and NYSAC flyweight champion Filipino Small Montana in London in January 1937 to establish himself as the undisputed world flyweight boxing champion.

In his next fight he beat Spanish flyweight champion Fortunato Ortega on points. In March he was disqualified against Len Hampston when his second entered the ring. The two met again three weeks later, with Lynch winning via a tenth round stoppage. In June he was again beaten by Warnock in a fight for which he failed to make the weight.

In October 1937 he handed Peter Kane his first loss by knockout in a defence of his British and world titles. One of his training sessions before the fight had attracted 10,000 spectators. Towards the end of the month he was knocked unconscious in a car crash. Two months later he stopped Georges Bataille in the eighth round at the Granby Halls in Leicester.

Lynch and Kane met again in March 1938, fighting a draw, with Lynch again failing to make the weight and paying a forfeit.

Lynch was arrested later that month and charged with driving offences after crashing his car while drunk and hitting a telegraph pole and a pram containing a 12-week-old baby, and failing to stop after the accident. His trial was delayed until after his world title fight with American Jackie Jurich. He forfeited his world flyweight title against Jurich, when he weighed in at 118.5 lb (53.8 kg), half a pound over the bantamweight limit. Lynch stopped Jurich in the 12th round, but lost the title. At his trial in July, he was fined £20 and disqualified from driving for a year.

Decline and death 

In July 1938 he was fined £200 by the BBBofC and stripped of his British and European titles; Lynch appealed against the decision. In September his boxing licence was suspended for a breach of training regulations. He did, however, face K.O. Morgan at bantamweight later that month at Shawfield Park, losing on points despite being once again over the agreed weight and over 7lbs heavier than his opponent.

In October 1938, after his weight increased again and he suffered a third-round knockout at the hands of Aurel Toma, he was offered 'three months holiday' and received several weeks treatment at a sanatorium in Kent, arranged by the National Sporting Club in an attempt to return him to fitness. In December he left for Ireland to spend a fortnight in a monastery near Waterford.

In January 1939 he went missing during a training camp in Stirlingshire; He was found after being lost on the hills for over six hours, half a mile from his training base, wearing just pyjamas, a dressing gown, and slippers, and suffering from hypothermia.

In February 1939 he was arrested and charged with assault. In March he was found guilty of assaulting his estranged wife, his 11-year-old sister-in-law, and three police officers, with a further charge of assaulting his 18-month old son by attempting to gas him deemed not proven, and was fined £20, with an alternative sentence of 60 days in prison. In June he was the subject of court action by the Inland Revenue.

He was due to fight Dudley Lewis on 27 February 1939 but was prohibited from doing so by the BBBofC.

On 21 August 1939, the Boxing Board refused his application for the restoration of his boxing licence, stating that "he is at present not fit to carry on a career as a professional boxer".

In April 1940 he was fined 30 shillings after being found drunk in Glasgow Road, Ralston. In October 1942 he was charged with offences against a 7-year-old girl in a Glasgow cinema, and was subsequently found guilty of assaulting two girls aged 7 and 10.

He would continue to battle with alcoholism for the rest of his life despite several attempts to treat the disease. Lynch died in 1946 of malnutrition-induced respiratory failure, aged 33. He was buried at St. Kentigern's Cemetery, Glasgow, with some 2,000 people attending the funeral.

Legacy 
Lynch's life was the subject of Bill Bryden's 1974 stage play Benny Lynch, with a book of the play published in 1975, and a television adaptation made in 1976. A second play based on Lynch's life, written by Peter Arnett, was first performed in 1985.

He was featured on the cover of Scottish rock band Gun's second album, Gallus, in 1992. A documentary about the life of Benny Lynch, directed by John Mackenzie and narrated by Robert Carlyle, was made in 2003. Another documentary film about Lynch, Benny, directed by Andrew Gallimore, was first shown in 2017.

The Benny Lynch Story, a stage play written by David Carswell and directed by David Hayman Jr, with Stephen Purdon playing the boxing champion, toured Scotland in May and June 2019.

Professional boxing record

See also
List of flyweight boxing champions
List of British flyweight boxing champions

References

Further reading
 Benny: The Life and Times of a Fighting Legend – by John Burrowes

External links
 
 The Benny Lynch website

|-

|-

 https://www.hugmansworldchampionshipboxing.com/fly
 https://titlehistories.com/boxing/na/usa/ny/nysac-fl.html
 https://boxrec.com/media/index.php/National_Boxing_Association%27s_Quarterly_Ratings:_1937
 https://boxrec.com/media/index.php/National_Boxing_Association%27s_Quarterly_Ratings:_1936

1913 births
1946 deaths
Scottish male boxers
Flyweight boxers
World boxing champions
World flyweight boxing champions
World Boxing Association champions
People from Govan
Boxers from Glasgow
People from Gorbals
Alcohol-related deaths in Scotland
Drug-related deaths in Scotland